Frayed  is an Australian and British television comedy-drama series on ABC TV and Sky UK, and later Sky Max. It premiered in the United Kingdom on 26 September 2019, and in Australia on 16 October 2019. The series was created and written by Australian comedian Sarah Kendall, who also stars in it. It is produced by Nicole O'Donohue and directed by Shaun Wilson and Jennifer Leace, while Sharon Horgan serves as an executive producer.

In February 2021, it was announced that Frayed was renewed for a second season of six episodes. The second season began airing on 29 September 2021 in Australia on ABC TV. It aired in the UK on Sky Max from 23 February 2022.

Plot
Frayed is set in 1988 and follows the story of Samantha 'Sammy' Cooper, a wealthy housewife in London. She is forced to return to her hometown of Newcastle in Australia after the death of her husband, when she is told his accumulated debts leave her almost penniless. She returns to Newcastle with her privately-educated teenage son and daughter, who have never visited Australia before.  She moves in with her mother, a recovering alcoholic, and infantile brother Jim in her childhood beachfront home. She seeks work as the kids attend the local High School. Sammy revisits her past and the events that led her to flee the town as a teenager. She soon realises that everyone in her hometown hates her and she tries to get back to London, but she finds it difficult with numerous personal and financial obstacles along the way. Series Two sees the family finally returning to London, but in very reduced circumstances. Sammy embarks on trying to prove her lawyer swindled her on settling her husband's estate, since he now occupies her grand house in the London suburbs. Back in Newcastle, the accidental killing of a violent neighbour in Sammy's mother's house, the day before the family's departure for the UK, is investigated by an under-resourced pair of police.

Cast
 Sarah Kendall as Sammy Cooper
 Kerry Armstrong as Jean, Sammy's mother
 Ben Mingay as Jim
 George Houvardas as Chris
 Frazer Hadfield as Lenny
 Maggie Ireland-Jones as Tess
 Diane Morgan as Fiona
 Matt Passmore as Dan
 Robert Webb as Rufus
 Doris Younane as Bev
 Trystan Go as Bo
 Alexandra Jensen as Abby
 Christopher Stollery as Terry
 Pippa Grandison as Trish
 Jane Hall as Sandy
 Hamish Michael as Fairbank
 Georgina Symes as Deanne
 Maggie Dence as Mrs Atkins 
 Shaun Anthony Robinson as Dean Farrell
 Dalip Sondhi as Peter
 Lukas Whiting as Jude
 Sarah Thom as Mrs Alderidge

Episodes
<onlyinclude>

Season 1 (2019)

Season 2 (2021)

Reception

Critical reception
Reviews for the series have generally been mixed to positive. On Rotten Tomatoes, the first season holds a rating of 86% based on reviews from 14 critics. The website's critical consensus states: 
"Frayed's intentionally cringe humor may be squirm-inducing, but solid performances and a surprisingly sweet center will keep viewers watching - even if it's through their fingers."

In a review for website Chortle, Steve Bennett praised Kendall's performance, commenting that "Kendall, whose winningly dry performance is central to the show's appeal,  has said she wanted to offer an alternative view of 1980s Australia than the one portrayed in the sun-soaked scenes of Neighbours and Home And Away, and she’s certainly paints a much less romantic picture." He went on to mention that "Once Frayed’s premise is finally established, it offers plenty to suggest this is worth sticking with".

In a favourable review by Steve Dessau of website Beyond the Joke praised the cast performances and he said "It's not all laughs – some of the best laughs come via pop culture gags about The Thompson Twins – but there is more than enough that is funny and intriguing here to justify setting up a series link in your schedule."

Anthony Morris of Screenhub rated the series 4 stars out of 5 as  he was favourable of the opening episode, pointing out that the series gets dramedy right and that it is evident from the first episode. He said that "Frayed isn’t perfect: it slows down a lot once it hits Newcastle and Sammy (initially) is the kind of character it takes time to warm to. Almost all the characters are either angry or ditzy; eventually somebody’s going to have to have something going for them. But unlike a lot of dramedies, it seems likely the characters will be given the chance to grow. This feels more like it’s the start of a story than just setting up a situation."

In a more mediocre review from Jasper Rees of The Daily Telegraph, he criticized the first episode, stating that "[Frayed is]  a pungent Eighties-set comedy that doesn’t know how far to take the joke" and gave it 3 out of 5 stars.

Australian ratings

Season 1 (2019)

Season 2 (2021)

Awards and nominations

International release
In May 2020, it was announced that Frayed had been picked up in the United States as an HBO Max exclusive. The series was released on 30 July 2020.

Home media
"Frayed: Season One" was released on DVD in Australia (Region 4) on 27 November 2019 from Roadshow Entertainment and in the United Kingdom (Region 2) on 2 December 2019 via Spirit Entertainment.

References

External links

Australian Broadcasting Corporation original programming
Australian television sitcoms
2019 Australian television series debuts
2019 British television series debuts
Sky UK original programming
2010s British sitcoms
English-language television shows